The Hokkaidō frog or the Ezo brown frog (Rana pirica) is a species in the family Ranidae found in Hokkaidō, Japan, and Sakhalin, Russia. Its natural habitats are boreal forests, temperate forests, temperate shrubland, temperate grassland, rivers, swamps, intermittent freshwater lakes, freshwater marshes, intermittent freshwater marshes, arable land, ponds, and irrigated land.

References

Rana (genus)
Amphibians of Japan
Taxonomy articles created by Polbot
Amphibians described in 1991
Fauna of Sakhalin